The spotted box turtle (Terrapene nelsoni) is a species of turtle in the family Emydidae. The species is endemic to the Sierra Madre Occidental in Mexico.

Etymology
The specific name, nelsoni, is in honor of American biologist Edward William Nelson.

Subspecies
Two subspecies are recognized as being valid, including the nominotypical subspecies (listed in alphabetical order by subspecific name).

Northern spotted box turtle (Terrapene nelsoni klauberi) 
Southern spotted box turtle (Terrapene nelsoni nelsoni)

References

Sources
Tortoise & Freshwater Turtle Specialist Group (1996).  Terrapene nelsoni.   2006 IUCN Red List of Threatened Species. Retrieved 29 July 2007.

Further reading
Stejneger L (1925). "New species and subspecies of American turtles". J. Washington Acad. Sci. 15 (20): 462–463. (Terrapene nelsoni, new species, p. 463).

Reptiles of Mexico
Terrapene
Reptiles described in 1925
Taxa named by Leonhard Stejneger
Taxonomy articles created by Polbot